"Whenever You Come Around" is a song co-written and recorded by American country music artist Vince Gill.  It was released in April 1994 as the first single from the album When Love Finds You. The song reached number 2 on the Billboard Hot Country Singles & Tracks chart.  It was written by Gill and Pete Wasner. The song was covered by Willie Nelson in 2014 for his Band of Brothers album.

Critical reception
Deborah Evans Price, of Billboard magazine reviewed the song favorably saying that the song is "beautifully written and impeccably performed."

Commercial performance
"Whenever You Come Around" debuted at number 60 on the U.S. Billboard Hot Country Singles & Tracks for the week of April 16, 1994.  The song has sold 207,000 digital copies as of March 2019 since it became available for download.

Personnel
Complied from the liner notes.
Vince Gill – lead and backing vocals, electric guitar, electric guitar solo
John Barlow Jarvis – synthesizer pads
Tom Roady – percussion
Randy Scruggs – acoustic guitar
Steuart Smith – electric guitar
Carlos Vega – drums
Pete Wasner – keyboards
Willie Weeks – bass guitar
Trisha Yearwood – backing vocals

Charts

Year-end charts

References

1994 songs
Vince Gill songs
Willie Nelson songs
Songs written by Vince Gill
Songs written by Pete Wasner
Song recordings produced by Tony Brown (record producer)
1994 singles
MCA Records singles
1990s ballads
Country ballads